In the 1969 Virginia gubernatorial election, incumbent Governor Mills E. Godwin, Jr., a Democrat, was unable to seek re-election due to term limits. A. Linwood Holton, Jr., an attorney from Roanoke, was nominated again by the Republican Party to run against former United States Ambassador to Australia, Democratic candidate William C. Battle.  

The Democrats had held the governor's mansion for 84 years since 1885, and Holton's victory was considered a historic upset at the time. This was the first election in which Republicans won a gubernatorial election in the state. , this was the most recent Virginia gubernatorial election in which a Republican won the city of Alexandria.
And the last time prince Edward county did not vote for the winner

Candidates
William C. Battle, former United States Ambassador to Australia and son of former Governor John S. Battle (D), who defeated Henry Howell and Fred G. Pollard.
A. Linwood Holton, Jr., attorney from Roanoke (R)

Results

References

Gubernatorial
1969
Virginia
November 1969 events in the United States